Brimhall is a surname. Notable people with the surname include:

Cynthia Brimhall (born 1964), American model and B-movie actress
George H. Brimhall (1852–1932), President of Brigham Young University
George W. Brimhall (1814–1895), politician in territorial Utah
John Brimhall (1928–2003), American musical arranger and author of books on music composition, theory, and performance

See also
Brimhall Nizhoni, New Mexico, census-designated place (CDP) in McKinley County, New Mexico, United States
Grant R. Brimhall Library serves as the main library for the city of Thousand Oaks, California